Pierpaolo Cristofori (born 4 January 1956) is an Italian former modern pentathlete who competed in the 1976 Summer Olympics, in the 1980 Summer Olympics, and in the 1984 Summer Olympics. In 1984, he won a gold medal in the team event.

References

External links
 
 
 

1956 births
Living people
Italian male modern pentathletes
Olympic modern pentathletes of Italy
Modern pentathletes at the 1976 Summer Olympics
Modern pentathletes at the 1980 Summer Olympics
Modern pentathletes at the 1984 Summer Olympics
Olympic gold medalists for Italy
Olympic medalists in modern pentathlon
Sportspeople from Rome
Medalists at the 1984 Summer Olympics
20th-century Italian people